The 1996 Giro d'Italia was the 79th edition of the Giro d'Italia, one of cycling's Grand Tours. The field consisted of 160 riders, and 98 riders finished the race.

By rider

By nationality

References

1996 Giro d'Italia
1996